Caprinia fimbriata is a moth in the family Crambidae. It was described by E. Hering in 1903. It is found on Sulawesi.

References

Moths described in 1903
Spilomelinae